Grapes is a surname. Notable people with the surname include:

Sidney Grapes (1887–1958), English comedian
Steve Grapes (born 1953), English footballer